The Takano River is located in Kyoto Prefecture, Japan.

The Kamo River and Takano River join on the Tadasu River Banks (Jp., Tadasu-gawara 糺河原). There is the "River Confluence" shrine of Shimogamo Shrine, leading to the forested area called Tadasu-no-mori.

See also 
Kamo River

References

Rivers of Kyoto Prefecture
Rivers of Japan